Methodist Hospital is one of three major facilities comprising the Nebraska Methodist Health System. The hospital is located at 8303 Dodge St. in Omaha, Nebraska.

With more than 2,000 full-time employees and over 400 physicians on active staff, Methodist Hospital provides cardiovascular surgery, neurosurgery, women's services, cancer care, gastroenterology, orthopedics, and comprehensive diagnostic services.

Nebraska Methodist Hospital admits approximately 22,000 patients every year. It was the first hospital in Nebraska to earn Magnet designation for nursing excellence from the American Nurses Credentialing Center.

See also 

 Methodist Jennie Edmundson Hospital (Council Bluffs, Iowa)
 Methodist Women's Hospital (Elkhorn, Nebraska)

References 

Organizations based in Omaha, Nebraska
Hospitals in Omaha, Nebraska